American Heritage School may refer to:

 American Heritage School (Florida)
 American Heritage School (Utah)

See also
 Heritage (disambiguation)
 Heritage School (disambiguation)
 Heritage High School (disambiguation)
 Christian Heritage School (disambiguation)
 Heritage Academy (disambiguation)
 Heritage College (disambiguation)